Ypsolopha trichonella is a moth of the family Ypsolophidae. It is known from Spain, Croatia, the northern Aegean Islands and Turkmenistan.

The larvae feed on Ephedra species.

References

External links

lepiforum.de

Ypsolophidae
Moths of Europe
Moths of Asia